In mathematics, the superquadrics or super-quadrics (also superquadratics) are a family of geometric shapes defined by formulas that resemble those of ellipsoids and other quadrics, except that the squaring operations are replaced by arbitrary powers. They can be seen as the three-dimensional relatives of the superellipses. The term may refer to the solid object or to its surface, depending on the context. The equations below specify the surface; the solid is specified by replacing the equality signs by less-than-or-equal signs.

The superquadrics include many shapes that resemble cubes, octahedra, cylinders, lozenges and spindles, with rounded or sharp corners. Because of their flexibility and relative simplicity, they are popular geometric modeling tools, especially in computer graphics. It becomes an important geometric primitive widely used in computer vision, robotics, and physical simulation.

Some authors, such as Alan Barr, define "superquadrics" as including both the superellipsoids and the supertoroids. In modern computer vision literatures,  superquadrics and superellipsoids are used interchangeably, since superellipsoids are the most representative and widely utilized shape among all the superquadrics. Comprehensive coverage of geometrical properties of superquadrics and methods of their recovery from range images and point clouds are covered in several computer vision literatures. Useful tools and algorithms for superquadrics visualization, sampling, and recovery are open-sourced here.

Formulas

Implicit equation 
The surface of the basic superquadric is given by

where r, s, and t are positive real numbers that determine the main features of the superquadric. Namely:

 less than 1: a pointy octahedron modified to have concave faces and sharp edges.
 exactly 1: a regular octahedron.
 between 1 and 2: an octahedron modified to have convex faces, blunt edges and blunt corners.
 exactly 2: a sphere
 greater than 2: a cube modified to have rounded edges and corners.
 infinite (in the limit): a cube

Each exponent can be varied independently to obtain combined shapes. For example, if r=s=2, and t=4, one obtains a solid of revolution which resembles an ellipsoid with round cross-section but flattened ends. This formula is a special case of the superellipsoid's formula if (and only if) r = s.

If any exponent is allowed to be negative, the shape extends to infinity. Such shapes are sometimes called super-hyperboloids.

The basic shape above spans from -1 to +1 along each coordinate axis. The general superquadric is the result of scaling this basic shape by different amounts A, B, C along each axis. Its general equation is

Parametric description 
Parametric equations in terms of surface parameters u and v (equivalent to longitude and latitude if m equals 2) are

where the auxiliary functions are

and the sign function sgn(x) is

Spherical product

Barr introduces the spherical product which given two plane curves produces a 3D surface. If

are two plane curves then the spherical product is

This is similar to the typical parametric equation of a sphere:

which give rise to the name spherical product.

Barr uses the spherical product to define quadric surfaces, like ellipsoids, and hyperboloids as well as the torus,
superellipsoid, superquadric hyperboloids of one and two sheets, and supertoroids.

Plotting code 

The following GNU Octave code generates a mesh approximation of a superquadric:

function superquadric(epsilon,a)
  n = 50;
  etamax = pi/2;
  etamin = -pi/2;
  wmax = pi;
  wmin = -pi;
  deta = (etamax-etamin)/n;
  dw = (wmax-wmin)/n;
  [i,j] = meshgrid(1:n+1,1:n+1)
  eta = etamin + (i-1) * deta;
  w   = wmin + (j-1) * dw;
  x = a(1) .* sign(cos(eta)) .* abs(cos(eta)).^epsilon(1) .* sign(cos(w)) .* abs(cos(w)).^epsilon(1);
  y = a(2) .* sign(cos(eta)) .* abs(cos(eta)).^epsilon(2) .* sign(sin(w)) .* abs(sin(w)).^epsilon(2);
  z = a(3) .* sign(sin(eta)) .* abs(sin(eta)).^epsilon(3);

  mesh(x,y,z);
end

See also 
 Superegg
 Superellipsoid
 Ellipsoid

References

External links 

 Bibliography: SuperQuadric Representations
 Superquadric Tensor Glyphs
 SuperQuadric Ellipsoids and Toroids, OpenGL Lighting, and Timing
 Superquadrics by Robert Kragler, The Wolfram Demonstrations Project.
 Superquadrics in Python
 Superquadrics recovery algorithm in Python and MATLAB

Computer graphics
Computer vision
Robotics
Geometry
Geometry in computer vision